Steve Round (born 9 November 1970) is an English football coach and former player. He was previously the assistant manager at Premier League sides Everton and Manchester United, and Director of Football at Aston Villa. He is currently part of Mikel Arteta's coaching staff at Arsenal.

Playing career
As a player, Round was a full-back with Derby County, before being forced to retire early through injury after only nine league appearances. He joined the club's coaching staff, and it was here that he first worked with Steve McClaren. When McClaren was appointed Middlesbrough manager in 2001, he appointed Round to his coaching staff.

Managerial and coaching career

Head coach
McClaren was named as England head coach in 2006, and again appointed Round to his backroom staff. Round continued with Middlesbrough in a dual role until 15 December 2006, when he left the club by mutual consent following a "difference in philosophy and ideas" with new manager Gareth Southgate.

Team coach
Round became first-team coach at Newcastle on 1 July 2007, working under Sam Allardyce. On 4 July 2008, Round became the new assistant manager to David Moyes at Everton, replacing Alan Irvine who had left midway through the previous season.

Assistant manager
In May 2013 it was announced Round would follow Moyes to Manchester United, where he was to succeed long-serving manager Sir Alex Ferguson. Round started in his new post on 1 July. On 22 April 2014, Round was relieved of his duties at United following the sacking of Moyes.

Director
On 1 September 2016, Round was appointed as Director of Football at Aston Villa.
On 4 July 2018, Round left Aston Villa as director of football.

Media
Round was involved in the Amazon Original sports docuseries All or Nothing: Arsenal, which documented the club by spending time with the coaching staff and players behind the scenes both on and off the field throughout their 2021–22 season.

Honours

Assistant
Arsenal
 FA Cup: 2019–20
 FA Community Shield: 2020

References

1970 births
Living people
Sportspeople from Burton upon Trent
English footballers
Association football fullbacks
Derby County F.C. players
Derby County F.C. non-playing staff
Middlesbrough F.C. non-playing staff
Newcastle United F.C. non-playing staff
English Football League players
Everton F.C. non-playing staff
Manchester United F.C. non-playing staff
Nuneaton Borough F.C. players
English football managers